Kurumba Gounder is a community from South India, especially the state of Tamil Nadu.

A Hindu ceremony characteristic of the  Kurumba Gounder are gatherings at a Mahalakshmi temple for a ceremony of supplication for health and success, during which coconuts are smashed on supplicants' heads.

References

Social groups of Tamil Nadu
Gounder